HMAS Nereus (19) was formerly a luxury motor cruiser, commissioned as a channel patrol boat operated by the Royal Australian Navy (RAN) during the Second World War. She was one of thirteen similar vessels, known to Sydneysiders as the 'Hollywood Fleet'.

Prior to the War, she was a private vessel built by Lars Halvorsen & Sons and launched in 1939. She was 66 feet (20.12m) in length, with a breadth of 16 feet (4.88m) making her one of the larger vessels of the Hollywood Fleet.  She was powered by twin Chryslers eight cylinder marine engines, each of 175hp.  She had six cabins, two forward, two amidships and two aft, toilets port and starboard, lounge, saloon, a fore cabin, pantry/galley complete with refrigerator and gas stove, an engine ‘room’ and a bridge control cabin and cockpit.  She was built of hardwood laminated timbers with Oregon stringers and planking.

She was requisitioned and fully commissioned into the RAN on 30 December 1941 under the command of Second Lieutenant E B Beeham RANVR. Nereus was armed with .303 Vickers machine guns fore and aft and depth charge racks on the stern.

Nereus played no role in the Battle of Sydney Harbour (often referred to as the attack on Sydney Harbour) and her whereabouts at the time has not been established. However, Muirhead-Gould’s (commander of Sydney Harbour) 22 June Report, includes that on the night after the Battle, Nereus attacked and claimed to have sunk a submarine in Vaucluse Bay. At the time of his report, Muirhead-Gould believed the claim was genuine, but later considered the report to be a false sighting.

Fate
On 2 July 1942, just over a month after the Battle of Sydney Harbour, HMAS Nereus was destroyed by fire. At the time, she had just relieved HMAS Yarroma at the buoy in Obelisk Bay, Sydney Harbour./>

Notes

References

Blunt, William; Lolita and the Hollywood Fleet, First Edition, May 2020.   http://www.lolitaandthehollywoodfleet.com  This publication includes an analysis of specific aspects of the Battle of Sydney Harbour, failures by the Navy, and comprehensive details of the thirteen vessels that formed the 'Hollywood Fleet'
Cassells, Vic; For those in peril: a comprehensive listing of the ships and men of the Royal Australian Navy who have paid the supreme sacrifice in the wars of the twentieth century, Kenthurst, Kangaroo Press, 1995

1939 ships
Patrol vessels of the Royal Australian Navy